Carroll Clark (February 6, 1894 – May 17, 1968) was an American art director. He was nominated for seven Academy Awards in the category Best Art Direction. He worked on 173 films between 1927 and 1968. He was born in Mountain View, California and died in Glendale, California.

Early filmography

Award Nominations
Clark was nominated for seven Academy Awards for Best Art Direction: 
 The Gay Divorcee (1934)
 Top Hat (1935)
 A Damsel in Distress (1937)
 Flight for Freedom (1943)
 Step Lively (1944)
 The Absent-Minded Professor (1961)
 Mary Poppins (1964)

See also
 Art Directors Guild Hall of Fame

References

External links

1894 births
1968 deaths
American art directors
People from Mountain View, California
American production designers
Emmy Award winners

Burials at Forest Lawn Memorial Park (Glendale)